In algebraic geometry, a presheaf with transfers is, roughly, a presheaf that, like cohomology theory, comes with pushforwards, “transfer” maps. Precisely, it is, by definition, a contravariant additive functor from the category of finite correspondences (defined below) to the category of abelian groups (in category theory, “presheaf” is another term for a contravariant functor).

When a presheaf F with transfers is restricted to the subcategory of smooth separated schemes, it can be viewed as a presheaf on the category with extra maps , not coming from morphisms of schemes but also from finite correspondences from X to Y 

A presheaf F with transfers is said to be -homotopy invariant if  for every X. 

For example, Chow groups as well as motivic cohomology groups form presheaves with transfers.

Finite correspondence 

Let  be algebraic schemes (i.e., separated and of finite type over a field) and suppose  is smooth. Then an elementary correspondence is an irreducible closed subscheme ,  some connected component of X, such that the projection  is finite and surjective.

Note that the category  is an additive category since each Hom set  is an abelian group.

With the product of schemes taken as the monoid operation, the category  is a symmetric monoidal category.

Sheaves with transfers 
The basic notion underlying all of the different theories are presheaves with transfers. These are contravariant additive functorsand their associated category is typically denoted , or just  if the underlying field is understood. Each of the categories in this section are abelian categories, hence they are suitable for doing homological algebra.

Etale sheaves with transfers 
These are defined as presheaves with transfers such that the restriction to any scheme  is an etale sheaf.

Nisnevich sheaves with transfers 
There is a similar definition for Nisnevich sheaf with transfers, where the Etale topology is switched with the Nisnevich topology.

Examples

Units 
The sheaf of units  is a presheaf with transfers.

Representable functors 
One of the basic examples of presheaves with transfers are given by representable functors. Given a smooth scheme  there is a presheaf with transfers  sending .

Representable functor associated to a point 

Pointed schemes 
This morphism induces a morphism  whose cokernel is denoted . There is a splitting coming from the structure morphism , so there is an induced map , hence .

Representable functor associated to A1-0 
There is a representable functor associated to the pointed scheme  denoted .

Smash product of pointed schemes 
Given a finite family of pointed schemes  there is an associated presheaf with transfers , also denoted  from their Smash product. This is defined as the cokernel ofFor example, given two pointed schemes , there is the associated presheaf with transfers  equal to the cokernel ofThis is analogous to the smash product in topology since  where the equivalence relation mods out .

Wedge of single space 
A finite wedge of a pointed space  is denoted .

Homotopy invariant sheaves 
A presheaf with transfers  is homotopy invariant if the projection morphism  induces an isomorphism  for every smooth scheme . There is a construction associating a homotopy invariant sheaf for every presheaf with transfers  using an analogue of simplicial homology.

Simplicial homology 
That is,gives the induced morphism . Then, to a presheaf with transfers , there is an associated complex of presheaves with transfers  sendingand has the induced chain morphismsgiving a complex of presheaves with transfers. The homology invaritant presheaves with transfers  are homotopy invariant.

Relation with Chow group of zero cycles 
Denote . There is an induced surjection  which is an isomorphism for  projective.

Zeroth homology of Ztr(X) 

Motivic complexes 
These are called the -th motivic cohomology groups of weight .

Special cases 
There are a few special cases which can be analyzed explicitly. Namely, when . These results can be found in the fourth lecture of the Clay Math book.

Z(0) 
Since an open cover

Z(1) 
This gives the two motivic cohomology groupswhere the middle cohomology groups are Zariski cohomology.

General case: Z(n) 
There is a quasi-ismorphismhencewhich is found using splitting techniques along with a series of quasi-isomorphisms. The details are in lecture 15 of the Clay Math book.

See also 
Relative cycle
Motivic cohomology
Mixed motives (math)
Étale topology
Nisnevich topology

References

External links 
https://ncatlab.org/nlab/show/sheaf+with+transfer

Homotopical algebra
Sheaf theory
Functors